Süß (often transliterated into English: Suess, also sometimes Süss in German)  is a German surname that means sweet.

People with the name include:
 Joseph Süß Oppenheimer (1698-1738), German-Jewish banker
 Jud Süß (disambiguation), literary and dramatic works about Joseph Süß Oppenheimer
 Christoph Süß (1967), German comedian
 Christian Süß (1985), German table tennis player at the 2008 Summer Olympics in Beijing
 Wilhelm Süss, mathematician

See also
 Suss (disambiguation)
 Suess (disambiguation)
 Jud Süß (disambiguation)
 Sub (disambiguation)

German-language surnames